"Adrenalina" is a song by Italian singer Senhit, released on 8 March 2021 through Panini S.p.A. The song represented San Marino in the Eurovision Song Contest 2021 in Rotterdam, the Netherlands. The song features uncredited vocals from American rapper Flo Rida. A new revamped version featuring credited vocals from Flo Rida was released on 12 March 2021.

Eurovision Song Contest

Internal selection 
On 16 May 2020, San Marino RTV confirmed that Senhit would represent San Marino in the 2021 contest. A snippet of Senhit's entry was released on 7 March 2021, revealing that Flo Rida would be featured in the song. However Team San Marino behind the entry declared that "Flo Rida has been part of the production and is featured in the music video, but it's yet to be decided if he will take part on stage in Rotterdam. The rap part will either way remain."

At Eurovision 
The 65th edition of the Eurovision Song Contest took place in Rotterdam, the Netherlands and consisted of two semi-finals on 18 May and 20 May 2021, and the grand final on 22 May 2021. On 17 November 2020, it was announced that San Marino would be performing in the first half of the second semi-final of the contest.

Flo Rida in Eurovision
After much speculation about whether Flo Rida would perform in person, it was officially announced on 18 May 2021, just two days before Senhit was due to take part in the second semi-final on 20 May, that Flo Rida had arrived in Rotterdam and would join Senhit onstage.

Track listing

Charts

References 

2021 songs
2021 singles
English-language Italian songs
Eurovision songs of 2021
Eurovision songs of San Marino
Flo Rida songs
Senhit (singer) songs
Songs written by Flo Rida
Songs written by Jimmy Thörnfeldt
Songs written by Joy Deb
Songs written by Linnea Deb